KBIC (105.7 FM, "Radio Vida") is a radio station broadcasting a Spanish Religious format. Licensed to Raymondville, Texas, United States, the station serves the McAllen-Brownsville-Harlingen area. The station is currently owned by Christian Ministries of the Valley.

History
The Federal Communications Commission issued a construction permit for the station on March 5, 1991. The station was assigned the call sign KQUF on May 3, 1991. On October 7, 1991, the station changed its call sign to KARU, and on June 1, 1995, to the current KBIC. The station was granted its license to cover on December 31, 1997.

Translators
In addition to the main station, KBIC is relayed by an additional translator to widen its broadcast area.

References

External links

BIC
Radio stations established in 1997